The 143rd New York State Legislature, consisting of the New York State Senate and the New York State Assembly, met from January 7 to September 1920, during the second year of Al Smith's governorship, in Albany.

Background
Under the provisions of the New York Constitution of 1894, re-apportioned in 1917, 51 Senators and 150 assemblymen were elected in single-seat districts; senators for a two-year term, assemblymen for a one-year term. The senatorial districts consisted either of one or more entire counties; or a contiguous area within a single county. The counties which were divided into more than one senatorial district were New York (nine districts), Kings (eight), Bronx (three), Erie (three), Monroe (two), Queens (two) and Westchester (two). The Assembly districts were made up of contiguous area, all within the same county.

At this time there were two major political parties: the Republican Party and the Democratic Party. The Socialist Party also nominated tickets.

Elections
The New York state election, 1919, was held on November 4. No statewide elective offices were up for election. Two women were elected to the State Assembly: Elizabeth V. Gillette (Dem.), a physician, of Schenectady; and Marguerite L. Smith (Rep.), an athletics teacher, of Harlem.

Sessions
The Legislature met for the regular session at the State Capitol in Albany on January 7, 1920. Thaddeus C. Sweet (R) was re-elected Speaker.

At the beginning of the session, the five Socialist assemblymen were suspended by Speaker Sweet, pending a trial before the Assembly Committee on the Judiciary to determine whether they were fit to take their seats. Charles Evans Hughes (Rep.) and Governor Al Smith (Dem.) condemned Speaker Sweet and the Republican majority for taking this course of action.

On March 30, a majority of 7 members of the 13-member Judiciary Committee recommended the expulsion the five Socialists. Minority reports recommended the seating of all or part of the Socialist assemblymen.

In the early morning of April 1, the five Socialist assemblymen were expelled.

The Legislature adjourned at 2 a.m. on Sunday morning, April 25, after a session of 37 hours. During this last session, Marguerite L. Smith occupied for about half an hour the Speaker's chair.

On August 12, Gov. Al Smith called a special session of the Legislature for September 20, and ordered special elections to be held on September 16 to fill the vacancies caused by the expulsion of the Socialist members. The session was called to consider the housing situation in New York City.

On September 16, all five Socialists were re-elected to the Assembly.

The Legislature met for a special session at the State Capitol in Albany on September 20, 1920.

On September 21, Claessens, Solomon and Waldman were again expelled, while DeWitt and Orr were permitted by a majority vote to take their seats. However, DeWitt and Orr resigned their seats in protest against the ouster of their three comrades.

State Senate

Districts

Members
The asterisk (*) denotes members of the previous Legislature who continued in office as members of this Legislature.

Employees
 Clerk: Ernest A. Fay
 Sergeant-at-Arms: 
 Assistant Sergeant-at-Arms: 
 Principal Doorkeeper: 
 First Assistant Doorkeeper: 
 Stenographer:

State Assembly
Note: For brevity, the chairmanships omit the words "...the Committee on (the)..."

Assemblymen

Employees
 Clerk: Fred W. Hammond
Deputy Clerk: Wilson Messer
 Sergeant-at-Arms: Harry W. Haines
 Principal Doorkeeper: 
 First Assistant Doorkeeper: 
 Second Assistant Doorkeeper: 
 Stenographer: Edwin Van Cett
Postmaster: James H. Underwood

Notes

Sources
 New York Legislative Documents (143rd Session) (1920; Vol. I, No. 1 to 5)
 SENATE DEMOCRATS SPLIT OVER LEADER in NYT on January 7, 1920
 TWO CHAIRMANSHIPS FOR NEW YORK CITY in NYT on January 13, 1920

143
1920 in New York (state)
1920 U.S. legislative sessions